I Am a Wild Party (Live) is a live album by Canadian musician Kim Mitchell and his fourth solo release. It contains six live tracks; five of which were performed at The Oshawa Civic Auditorium in Oshawa, Ontario, and "Go For Soda" performed at The KEE to Bala, in Bala, Ontario. The album also contains two new studio tracks titled "I Am a Wild Party" and "Deep Dive", recorded live at rehearsal.

Commercial performance
I Am a Wild Party was the tenth-best selling Cancon album in Canada of 1990. The album was certified Platinum in Canada in 1991, and was just the third live album by a Canadian artist to sell more than 100,000 copies.

Track listing
All songs by Kim Mitchell and Pye Dubois
 "I Am a Wild Party" – 4:25 (new studio track)
 "That's the Hold" – 5:05
 "Battle Scar" – 5:54
 "Lager & Ale" – 4:11
 "Deep Dive" – 4:52 (new studio track)
 "All We Are" – 5:41
 "Rock n Roll Duty" – 4:17
 "Go for Soda" – 3:59

Personnel
Musicians
 Kim Mitchell – guitar, vocals, producer
 Peter Fredette – bass, vocals
 Greg Wells – keyboards
 Greg Critchley – drums (tracks 2–4, 6–7)
 Matt Frenette – drums (tracks 1, 5)
 Lou Molino – drums (track 8)

Production
 Doug McClement – live recordings engineer
 Bob Shindle – studo recordings engineer
 Mike Fraser – mixing at Little Mountain Sound Studios, Vancouver

References

Resources
 http://www.kimmitchell.ca

Kim Mitchell albums
1990 live albums
Alert Records albums